Cathrin Bretzeg (born 17 February 1965) is a Norwegian politician for the Conservative Party.

In 2004, while the second cabinet Bondevik held office, she was appointed State Secretary in the Ministry of Local Government and Regional Development. She lost this job when the cabinet fell following the 2005 election. She served as a deputy representative to the Norwegian Parliament from Akershus during the term 2005–2009.

References

1965 births
Living people
Deputy members of the Storting
Conservative Party (Norway) politicians
Norwegian state secretaries
Asker politicians
Women members of the Storting
Norwegian women state secretaries